Cathy Lee Guisewite (born September 5, 1950) is an American cartoonist who created the comic strip Cathy, which had a 34-year run. The strip focused on a career woman facing the issues and challenges of eating, work, relationships, and having a mother—or as the character put it in one strip, "the four basic guilt groups."

Early life
Guisewite was born in Dayton, Ohio to William L. and Anne Guisewite. She was raised in Midland, Michigan with older sister Mary Anne Nagy and younger sister Mickey. Guisewite graduated from Midland High School in 1968.

She attended the University of Michigan at Ann Arbor, Michigan, where she was a member of the Delta Delta Delta sorority. In 1972, she earned a bachelor's degree in English.

Career
After college, Guisewite followed her father's vocation and began working in advertising at Campbell-Ewald, then Norman Prady, and settled at W.B. Doner & Co. near Detroit. She became a vice president of the firm in 1976.

She continued to draw funny pictures as an "emotional coping mechanism" to events in her life and work, and she would forward them to her parents. Her mother kept urging her to send them to a publisher, so she did. "My entire goal with my submission package was to get my mother off my back. My goal was not to do a comic strip. It was to make Mom quit telling me I could do a comic strip."

Guisewite was flabbergasted when the company sent her a contract to produce a comic strip. Cathy was syndicated to 66 newspapers in 1976 by Universal Press Syndicate, now Universal Uclick, and Guisewite did both—her advertising job during the day, and comics at night. By 1980, the strip was carried by 150 dailies, she was earning $50,000 per year for Cathy, she quit the advertising business to work on Cathy full-time, and she moved to Santa Barbara, California.

The comic strip was a "running social commentary" for her confusion. Guisewite explained, "You were a liberated woman or you were a traditionalist. To even voice vulnerability if you were a feminist was wrong and to voice interest in liberation if you were a more traditional woman was wrong. So I believe the women I was speaking to in the early years of my strip were women like me, who were at that age in our 20s where we were kind of launched into adulthood with a foot in both worlds and no way to really express it.”

Guisewite appeared several times as a guest on the late night TV series The Tonight Show Starring Johnny Carson.

At the peak of the strip's popularity in the mid-1990s, it appeared in almost 1,400 papers. However, on August 11, 2010, Guisewite announced the strip's retirement after 34 years. Its run ended on October 3, 2010 (a Sunday strip).

Awards
In 1987, she received an Emmy Award for Outstanding Animated Program for the TV special Cathy.

Guisewite is a member of the National Cartoonists Society and received in 1993 its highest honor, the Reuben Award for Outstanding Cartoonist of the Year, for her work in 1992.

Guisewite has been granted honorary degrees from Russell Sage College, Rhode Island College, and Eastern Michigan University.

Personal life
Guisewite adopted daughter Ivy in 1992, then married screenwriter Christopher Wilkinson in 1997. Wilkinson has a son, Cooper, but the couple had no children together. Guisewite and Wilkinson divorced in 2010.

One of Guisewite's classmates at the University of Michigan was screenwriter Lawrence Kasdan. When Kasdan's movie The Big Chill (1983) opened, Guisewite devoted an entire week of Cathy strips to it, with Cathy and her co-workers enthusing over the film and seeing it repeatedly.

Publications
 The Cathy Chronicles, (1978) 
 What Do You Mean, I Still Don't Have Equal Rights??!!, (1980) 
 I think I'm having a relationship with a blueberry pie!, (1981) 
 What's a Nice Single Girl Doing with a Double Bed??!, (1981) 
 Another Saturday Night of Wild and Reckless Abandon, (1982) 
 It Must Be Love, My Face Is Breaking Out, (1982)
 Cathy's Valentine's Day Survival Book, How to Live through Another February 14, (1982)
 How to Get Rich, Fall in Love, Lose Weight, and Solve all Your Problems by Saying "NO", (1983)
 Eat Your Way to a Better Relationship, (1983)
 Climb Every Mountain, Bounce Every Check, (1983)
 A Mouthful of Breath Mints and No One to Kiss, (1983)
 Men Should Come With Instruction Booklets, (1984)
 Sorry I'm Late. My Hair Won't Start, (1985)
 Wake Me Up When I'm a Size 5", (1985)
 My Cologne Backfired, (1986)
 Stressed for Success, (1986)
 The Salesclerk made me Buy it, (1986) 
 Thin Thighs in Thirty Years, (1986)
 A Hand To Hold, An Opinion To Reject, (1987)
 I'll Pay $5,000 For a Swimsuit That Fits Me!!!, (1987)
 It must be something in the ink. , (1987)
 Two Pies. One Fork, (1987)
 May I borrow Your Husband and Baby?, (1988) 
 Why Do the Right Words Always Come Out of the Wrong Mouth?, (1988)
 My Granddaughter Has Fleas!!, (1989)
 Sue the Hairstylist, (1989)
 $14 in the Bank and a $200 Face in My Purse, (1990)
 It isn't smog. It's eyeshadow!, (1990) 
 The Family thigh problem begins with the mouth, (1990)
 Reflections, A Fifteenth Anniversary Collection, (1991) 
 Run for Your Life...The Man Is a Cow, (1991) 
 The Worse Things Get, the Better We Eat, (1991) 
 Between love and madness lies the shoe department, (1992) 
 Only Love Can Break a Heart, But a Shoe Sale Can Come Close, (1992)
 Dancing Through Life in a Pair of Broken Heels, (1993)
 I Want to Be the Person I Used to Be Repulsed By, (1993) 
 Like Mother, Like Daughter, (1993)
 Revelations from a 45-Pound Purse, (1993)
 The Child Within Has Been Awakened But The Old Lady on the Outside Just Collapsed, (1994)
 Understanding the "Why" Chromosome, (1995) 
 Cathy Twentieth Anniversary Collection, (1996)
 Shop Till You Drop Then Sit Down And Buy Shoes, (1996) 
 Cathy; Reciped and Foodstyles of the Stars, (1997)  
 Abs of Steel, Buns of Cinnamon, (1997)
 Girl Food, (1997) 
 I Am Woman, Hear Me Snore, (1998)
 Confessions to My Mother, (1999)
 I'd Scream Except I Look So Fabulous, (1999)
 Shoes: Chocolate For The Feet, (2000) 
 Food: A Celebration of One of the Four Basic Guilt Groups, (2001) 
 Love: A Celebration of One of the Four Basic Guilt Groups, (2001)
 Mom: A Celebration of One of the Four Basic Guilt Groups, (2001) 
 Work: A Celebration of One of the Four Basic Guilt Groups, (2001) 
 Cathy Collection: 25th Anniversary Book, (2001)    
 The Wedding of Cathy and Irving, (2005)
 The Mother-Daughter Dance, (2016)
 Fifty Things that Aren't My Fault: Essays From the Grown-Up Years, (2019)

References

External links

Cathy Guisewite; video produced by Makers: Women Who Make America''

1950 births
American comic strip cartoonists
American female comics artists
Female comics writers
Living people
People from Midland, Michigan
Midland High School (Midland, Michigan) alumni
Emmy Award winners
Reuben Award winners
University of Michigan College of Literature, Science, and the Arts alumni